Dhadna is a village in Fujairah, United Arab Emirates, located  north of the Fujairah City centre. The area's economy has depended since ancient times on agriculture and fishing, in which much of the population works today. The village is known for its large supply of water and has been a site for many farms of the royal families across the Emirates.

History

The village was the site of a major fire that broke out on January 22, 2018 where seven members of an Emirati family died.

References

Populated places in the Emirate of Fujairah
Seaside resorts in the United Arab Emirates
Villages in the United Arab Emirates